In cinema, behind-the-scenes (BTS), also known as the making-of, the set, or  on the set, is a type of documentary film that features the production of a film or television program. This is often referred to as the EPK (electronic press kit) video, due to its main usage as a promotional tool, either concurrent with theatrical release or as a bonus feature for the film's DVD or Blu-ray release.

History
Shorter behind-the-scenes documentaries are often used as a bonus on DVDs, as it offers more insight into the film, how it was made, and to credit the film crew. Occasionally, some films have included a "making of the making-of" as a joke. The making-of is also often released for TV as a part of the promotion of the film.

Examples of feature-length making-ofs
Burden of Dreams, the Fitzcarraldo making-of 
Hearts of Darkness: A Filmmaker's Apocalypse, the Apocalypse Now making-of 
Lost in La Mancha, a making-of documentary of the failed The Man Who Killed Don Quixote, which was eventually completed more than 15 years later

See also
Development hell
Director's cut
The Criterion Collection – a home media company specializing in special features on important and popular movie titles

References

Further reading 
 

 
Home video supplements
Film and video terminology
Film genres